Catherine Goddard Clarke , also known as Sister Catherine, (August 21, 1900 – May 8, 1968) was an American Traditionalist Catholic writer, educator, and lay religious sister. She was the founder of the Saint Benedict Center in Cambridge, Massachusetts and, alongside Father Leonard Feeney, a founder of the Slaves of the Immaculate Heart of Mary.

Biography 
In 1940, Clarke sought permission from Cardinal William Henry O'Connell, Archbishop of Boston, to establish an educational center near Harvard University. Cardinal O'Connell granted her permission, and so she started Saint Benedict Center in Harvard Square, Cambridge. She led the center with the help of Avery Dulles, then a Harvard law student, and Christopher Huntington, a Harvard dean. Saint Benedict's provided religious instruction to Catholic students at Harvard and Radcliffe College. Dulles, who would later become a Cardinal, asked Clarke to serve as his godmother upon his conversion to Catholicism.

In 1942, Father Leonard Feeney, a Jesuit priest, became associated with the center. Clarke invited him to serve as the spiritual director of the center in 1943. Clarke, as one of the teachers, gave weekly evening lectures on church history at the center. The center later evolved into St. Benedict Abbey in Still River, Massachusetts.

On January 17, 1949, Clarke, Father Feeney, and Fakhri Maluf founding the Slaves of the Immaculate Heart of Mary, a Traditionalist Catholic religious community. The community adopted Louis de Montfort as their patron saint. Families associated with the St. Benedict Center moved to the religious community. Clarke served as a community leader of the Slaves of the Immaculate Heart of Mary, and taught the children at the community's school. She followed Feeneyism, a doctrinal position taught by Father Feeney that took the Catholic doctrine Extra Ecclesiam nulla salus literally, believing that there is no salvation outside of the Catholic Church. In one of her books, Clarke wrote that "in absolute literalness, we must admit that it is possible for a human being to lose his soul without being guilty of any sin committed by himself." She also reportedly taught that "martyrdom is the surest way to get into Heaven."

Clarke died from complications related to cancer on May 8, 1968.

Allegations of abuse 
The Slaves of the Immaculate Heart of Mary has been accused of being a cult by former members. In May 2020, Patricia Walsh Chadwick, a former member of the Slaves of the Immaculate Heart of Mary, accused Clarke of physically abusing her and other children that grew up in the religious community. Chadwick wrote about the alleged abuse in her memoir titled Little Sister.

Selected works
Clarke wrote multiple books on Catholic history, theology, and spirituality including Our Glorious Popes, Charlemagne and the Finding of the Body of St. Anne, The Pontificate of Pope Saint Leo the Great, The Life of Saint Gregory the Great, Gate of Heaven, The Failure of Interfaith, Love Is The Spirit Of Truth, and The Loyolas and the Cabots.

References 

1900 births
1968 deaths
20th-century American women writers
20th-century American Roman Catholic nuns
American Roman Catholic religious writers
American traditionalist Catholics
American women essayists
American women historians
Catholics from Massachusetts
Historians of the Catholic Church
Religious leaders from Massachusetts
Roman Catholic religious educators
Traditionalist Catholic nuns and religious sisters
Traditionalist Catholic writers